Puerto Libertad is a town and port of the Mexican state of Sonora, Mexico located on the north coast of the Gulf of California, in the municipality of Pitiquito.

Puerto Libertad is located at the geographic coordinates 29 ° 54'15 "N 112 ° 40'59" W / 29.90417, -112.68306, at an altitude of 10 meters above sea level, the distance that separates it from the capital state, the city of Hermosillo, is 416 kilometers and they are connected through the so-called coastal road. A place dedicated to fishing activities and also hosts one of the largest power plants in Mexico, operated by the Comisión Federal de Electricidad. According to the results of the Census of Population and Housing 2005 Puerto Libertad population is 2,823 people, 1,489 of which are men and 1,334 women.

Because Puerto Libertad is home to a large, aged, heavy fuel burning power station operated by the national utility company, the town is the site of a proposed algal biofuel project which would produce ethanol. The system works on exhaust from the electric power plant. The two companies working on the project are an American Algenol technology and Mexican operator owner Biofields. Puerto Libertad is also the site of a solar energy project being developed by Sonora Energy Group Hermosillo, S.A. de C.V.

Puerto Libertad is located in the Sonoran Desert environment, which in conjunction with the sea, gives it a very special appeal, so it is increasingly attracting development of tourism.

Climate 

Puerto Libertad has a desert climate (Köppen climate classification BWh).

Gallery

References

Populated places in Sonora
Populated places in the Sonoran Desert of Mexico
Pitiquito Municipality